is a former Japanese footballer who mostly played for Kagoshima United FC.

Club statistics
Updated to 23 February 2020.

References

External links

Profile at Kagoshima United FC 

1991 births
Living people
Momoyama Gakuin University alumni
Association football people from Osaka Prefecture
Sportspeople from Osaka
Japanese footballers
J2 League players
J3 League players
Japan Football League players
Giravanz Kitakyushu players
Kagoshima United FC players
Association football defenders